Hands Free may refer to:

Handsfree, an adjective to describe equipment that can be used without the use of hands
"Hands Free" (Law & Order), a 2004 episode of the television series Law & Order
"Hands Free" (song), a 2016 song recorded by Keke Palmer
Hands Free, a 1992 album by Craig McLachlan

See also